Austrolfersia is a genus of biting flies in the family of louse flies, Hippoboscidae. There is only one known species, Austrolfersia ferrisi Bequaert, 1953. It is a parasite of Diprotodontia.

Distribution 
It is only found in Queensland, Australia.

Hosts 
Red-legged pademelon (Thylogale stigmatica) and the musky rat-kangaroo (Hypsiprymnodon moschatus)

References 

Parasitic flies
Parasites of marsupials
Hippoboscidae
Hippoboscoidea genera
Monotypic Brachycera genera
Taxa named by Joseph Charles Bequaert